Santa Cruz Futebol Clube, commonly known as Santa Cruz is an East Timorese football club based in Dili. The team plays in the Liga Futebol Amadora.

Competition records

Liga Futebol Amadora 
2016: 6th place in Groub B Segunda Divisao

Taça 12 de Novembro
2016: 1st Round

References

Football clubs in East Timor
Football
Sport in Dili